King Yangheon (died 1099; born Wang Do) was a Goryeo Royal Prince as the first and oldest son of King Munjong and Consort Ingyeong who would become the grandfather of the future Queen Janggyeong, Queen Uijeong, and Queen Seonjeong. He was known as Marquess Joseon and Duke Joseon during his lifetime.

Biography

Early life and disputation of birth year
Born as the eldest son of Munjong of Goryeo and Princess Suryeong, he was named Do (도, 燾) and have 2 younger brothers: Wang Su and Wang Yu. Although the year when he was born is unknown, but based on "Epitaph of Yi Ja-yeon" (이자연 묘지명, 李子淵 墓誌銘), at the death of Yi in 1061, only three names that recorded as his royal grandsons: the crown prince, Marquess Gukwon, and Wang Do. From this, it was believed that Wang Do was born before Sukjong in 1054 or Uicheon in 1055.

Life and marriage
Wang Do's years of becoming the Marquess Joseon (조선후, 朝鮮侯) is unclear, but it was recorded in 1061 (based on Goryeosa) or in 1062 (based on Goryeosajeoryo). He was later honoured as Duke Joseon (조선공, 朝鮮公) in 1077 (31st years reign of his father) and appointed as Sutaebo (수태보, 守太保) in 1086. In 1094 (ascension year of King Heonjong), he became Sutaesa (수태사, 守太師) and Susado (수사도, 守司徒) a year later along with received 5000 sik-eup and 500 siksil-bong (식읍오천호식실봉오백호, 食邑五千戶食實封五百戶).

Wang Do was married with the second daughter of one of his maternal uncle, Yi Jeong (이정) and they had three sons together. Their second son would marry Princess Ansu (안수궁주) who was one of King Sukjong's daughter while their third son's children were all marrying King Injong's children (Queen Janggyeong, Marchioness Daeryeong, Queen Uijeong, Queen Seonjeong, Wang Yeong).

In 1099 (4th years reign of King Sukjong), Duke Joseon died and received name Yangheon (양헌, 襄憲) as his Posthumous name given by Sukjong own. According to the "Epitaph of Wang Won" (왕원 묘지명, 王源 墓誌銘), the late Duke Joseon was later honoured as King Yangheon of Joseon State (조선국 양헌왕, 朝鮮國 禳憲王) and following this, his wife, Lady Yi was honoured as "Queen Consort Yangheon" (양헌왕비, 禳憲王妃).

Family 
Father: Munjong of Goryeo (고려문종, 29 December 1019 – 2 September 1083)
Grandfather: Hyeonjong of Goryeo (고려현종, 1 August 992 – 17 June 1031)
Grandmother: Queen Wonhye of the Ansan Gim clan (원혜왕후김씨; d. 31 July 1022)
Mother: Worthy Consort Ingyeong of the Incheon Yi clan
Grandmother: Lady Gim, of the Gyeongju Gim (부인 김씨)
Grandfather: Yi Ja-yeon (이자연)
Consorts and their Respective issue(s):
Queen Yangheon, of the Inju Yi clan (양헌왕비 인주이씨)
Wang Ja (왕자), first son
Wang Won (광평공 왕원, 1083 – 1170), Duke Gwangpyeong, second son
Wang On (강릉공 왕온, d.1146), Duke Gangreung, third son

References

Duke Joseon on Encykorea .

Korean princes
Year of birth unknown
1099 deaths
11th-century Korean people